The 1941 Texas A&M Aggies football team was an American football team that represented Texas A&M University as a member of the Southwest Conference during the 1941 college football season. In their eighth season under head coach Homer Norton, the Aggies compiled a 9–1 record in the regular season, won the conference championship, and were ranked No. 9 in the final AP Poll. The team then lost to Alabama in the 1942 Cotton Bowl Classic. The team outscored all opponents by a total of 281 to 75. The team played its home games at Kyle Field in College Station, Texas.

Four Texas A&M players were selected by the Associated Press (AP) or United Press (UP) on the 1941 All-Southwest Conference football team: back Derace Moser (AP-1, UP-1); end James Sterling (AP-1, UP-1); tackle Martin Ruby (AP-1, UP-1); and center Bill Sibley (AP-1, UP-1). Moser was also selected as the most valuable player in the Southwest Conference.

Schedule

References

Texas AandM
Texas A&M Aggies football seasons
Southwest Conference football champion seasons
Texas AandM Aggies football